Parliamentary elections were held in Lebowa on 15 March 1978 and for two districts (Morerong, Sekhukhune) later, on 12 July 1978.

References

Lebowa
Elections in South African bantustans
Lebowa
March 1978 events in Africa